The men's luge at the 2014 Winter Olympics was held between 8–9 February 2014 at the Sliding Center Sanki in Rzhanaya Polyana, Russia. Germany's Felix Loch was the two-time defending world champion and won the gold medal with the fastest time in two of the four runs. The test event that took place at the venue was won by Germany's Andi Langenhan.
Loch was also the defending Olympic champion.

On December 22, 2017 Albert Demchenko of Russia was banned for doping violations and his silver medal was stripped.
On 1 February 2018, his results were restored as a result of the successful appeal.

Qualifying athletes
The top 38, with each nation allowed a maximum of 3, after five of five races. India and South Korea (the next two unrepresented nations) get the additional quota spots, as no nations were able to use them to complete a relay.
Slovenia and Great Britain rejected their quota spots. The next three nations in the rankings (Bulgaria, Netherlands and Chinese Taipei) received the quotas. Netherlands rejected their quota, and as the last country with meeting qualification standard, this meant only 39 athletes would compete.

Competition schedule
All times are (UTC+4).

Results
Four runs, split over two days, were used to determine the winner.

References
Keshavan competed as an Independent Olympic Participant, with this event taking place before the India Olympic Committee's suspension was lifted

Luge at the 2014 Winter Olympics
Men's events at the 2014 Winter Olympics